Chennai Central is the main railway terminus in Chennai, Tamil Nadu, India.

Chennai Central may also refer to:
Chennai Central (Lok Sabha constituency), a constituency in Chennai, Tamil Nadu, India
Chennai Central metro station, an underground metro station in Chennai, India

See also
Central Chennai, a part of Chennai city between the Coovum and Adyar Rivers
Chennai Central–Bangalore City line, a railway route that connects Chennai, Tamil Nadu and Bengaluru, Karnataka, India
Chennai Central–Coimbatore Shatabdi Express, a Shatabdi superfast train in Tamil Nadu, India
Chennai Central Hazrat Nizamuddin Garib Rath Express, a superfast train that runs to New Delhi, India
Chennai Central–Mysuru Shatabdi Express, a superfast train that runs to Mysore, Karnataka, India